Starogród Dolny  is a village in the administrative district of Gmina Chełmno within Chełmno County, Kuyavian-Pomeranian Voivodeship in north-central Poland.

References

Villages in Chełmno County